Kristen Miller (born August 20, 1976) is an American actress. She is best known for her roles as Ashley Elliot on the sitcom USA High (1997–1999) and Deedra "D.D." Cummings on the action-adventure series She Spies (2002–2004).

Miller has also had recurring roles and made guest appearances on many television shows, including Undressed (2000), That's My Bush! (2001), Charmed (2004), Two and a Half Men (2005), Joey (2005), I Hate My 30's (2007), Las Vegas (2008), 90210 (2009), Dexter (2011), Mad Men (2012), Castle (2012) and The Glades (2013). Her films include Cherry Falls (2000), Team America: World Police (2004), The Fallen Ones (2005) and Single White Female 2: The Psycho (2005). She also provided the voice-over role for the character Rio in the video game Lifeline (2004).

Personal life
Miller grew up in Manhattan Beach, California. She is married to television producer Morgan Langley, whom she wed in June 2007.

Filmography

Film

Television

Web

References

External links
 Tv.com biography of Kristen Miller
 

1976 births
American television actresses
American voice actresses
Living people
People from Greater Los Angeles
20th-century American actresses
21st-century American actresses
Actors from Manhattan Beach, California